The 1962 Cleveland Browns season was the team's 13th season with the National Football League.

Exhibition schedule 

There was a doubleheader on August 18, 1962, Cowboys vs Lions and Steelers vs Browns.

Regular season schedule 

Note: Intra-conference opponents are in bold text.

Week 1 
The Browns gave a record opening-day crowd of 81,115 at Cleveland Stadium something to remember in a 17–7 victory over the Giants. The game's most memorable play is a flea-flicker that set up a 29-yard Lou Groza field goal. Quarterback Jim Ninowski hands the ball to Jim Brown, who hands to receiver Ray Renfro, who hands the ball back to Ninowski, who completes a 53-yard pass to Rich Kreitling.

Week 2 
Bobby Mitchell, traded by coach Paul Brown to Washington during the offseason, haunts his old team by scoring the winning touchdown in a 17–16 Redskins victory at Cleveland. With the Browns leading 16–10 late in the fourth quarter and trying to run out the clock, Jim Brown fumbles, giving the Redskins possession near midfield. Norm Snead throws a short pass to Mitchell, who races for the go-ahead touchdown. The Browns get two shots at a final-minute game-winning field goal, but both of Lou Groza's attempts are blocked.

Week 5 
The Browns are beaten decisively by the Colts 36–14 at Cleveland Stadium. The Browns do not get a first down until the Colts had a 23–0 lead. Jim Brown had his worst rushing total ever: 11 yards on 14 attempts, with seven of those yards coming on one carry.

Week 8 
In one of the uglier games played at Cleveland Stadium, the Browns and Philadelphia Eagles combine for eight turnovers and five missed field goals in a 14–14 tie. Jim Brown finishes with 69 rushing yards on 20 carries, his seventh consecutive game with fewer than 100 yards.

Week 11 
Jim Brown, ending the longest 100-yard drought of his career at nine games, pounds for 110 in a 35–14 win over the Pittsburgh Steelers at Cleveland Stadium. Frank Ryan complements Brown by throwing for 284 yards and three touchdowns.

Week 14 
In what would be the final game of Paul Brown's Cleveland coaching career, the Browns beat the San Francisco 49ers, 13–10 at Kezar Stadium. The Browns avoid their second losing season but cannot save their coach's job. Needing 139 yards for another 1,000-yard campaign, Jim Brown falls just short, ending the year at 996. Although Brown fails to win a rushing title for the first time in his career, he does lead the team in receiving for the first time, catching 47 passes for 517 yards and five touchdowns.

Standings

Personnel

Roster

Staff

References

External links 
 1962 Cleveland Browns season at Profootballreference.com 
 1962 Cleveland Browns season statistics at jt-sw.com 
 1962 Cleveland Browns at DatabaseFootball.com  

Cleveland
Cleveland Browns seasons
Cleveland Browns